is a 2009 Japanese film, based on manga series Gokusen. It was directed by Tōya Satō, who also directed the live-action film version of Kaiji. This film is the sequel to the television drama Gokusen season 3, and the last of the series. This film has action, comedy and drama just like the TV series. It was released on July 11, 2009.

Cast

Starring
 Yukie Nakama as Kumiko Yamaguchi
 Kazuya Kamenashi as Ryū Odagiri
 Yuya Takaki as Yamato Ogata
 Haruma Miura as Ren Kazuma

Co-starring
 Katsuhisa Namase as Gorō Sawatari
 Yuta Tamamori as Reita Takasugi
 Shun Oguri as Haruhiko Uchiyama
 Win Morisaki as Igarashi Makoto

Reception
The film has grossed ¥490 million in opening weekend. According to the Motion Picture Producers Association of Japan, the film grossed ¥3.48 billion in Japan during 2009. The film also grossed $154,113 overseas in Singapore, Hong Kong and Taiwan.

References

External links
 

2009 films
2000s Japanese films
Live-action films based on manga
Nippon TV films
2000s Japanese-language films
Toho films
Films scored by Michiru Ōshima
Films directed by Tōya Satō